Andrea Natasha Heyworth Law (born 1 January 1970) is an English painter and graphic designer.

Early life
Law was the first child of Margaret Anne (née Heyworth) a comprehensive school teacher, and Peter Robert Law (professionally known as Sir Taggalot) a British actor. Law is the elder sister of Jude Law, an English actor, film producer, and director.

She gained experience acting at the Bob Hope Theatre (then called the Eltham Little Theatre) in Eltham, where she performed in Teenage Follies in 1982. She first went to University of Warwick to study history, but soon switched to studying art at Camberwell College of Arts in South London.

Career 
After graduation, Law embarked on a career that encompassed graphic illustration, photography and styling. She has worked with Vogue, Max Mara, Teen Vogue, Globe-Trotter, Harrods, Samsung, Tiffany & Co and Mulberry. She is known for her illustrations of women that represent the art and fashion worlds combined into one, focusing on line, shape, and color. Her artwork is exhibited in galleries in London, Hong Kong, and New York.

Works
Law's extensive list of artworks and projects includes a series called My Flash on You which is exhibited at Eleven Gallery in the UK in 2022. The paintings depict women in the act of dressing or undressing, made with gloss paint on aluminum and paper. Although simple at a first glance, her line and shape drawings are eye-catching and carefully composed.

Personal life
She lives in Peckham, London with her husband and three children.

References

1970 births
Living people
English women painters
English graphic designers
People from Lewisham
21st-century British women artists
Women graphic designers
21st-century English women
21st-century English people